The following is a chronicle of events during the year 1974 in ice hockey.

National Hockey League
Art Ross Trophy as the NHL's leading scorer during the regular season: Phil Esposito  ]  
Hart Memorial Trophy: for the NHL's Most Valuable Player:  Phil Esposito
Stanley Cup -   1974 Stanley Cup Finals
With the first overall pick in the 1974 NHL Amateur Draft,

World Hockey Association

Canadian Hockey League
Ontario Hockey League:  J. Ross Robertson Cup.
Quebec Major Junior Hockey League:  won President's Cup (QMJHL) for the first time in team history
Western Hockey League:   President's Cup (WHL) for the first time in team history
Memorial Cup:

International hockey

World Hockey Championship
 
The Soviet Union won the gold medal

European hockey

Minor League hockey
AHL:   Calder Cup
IHL:   Turner Cup.
 Allan Cup: Barrie Flyers

Junior A hockey

University hockey
 NCAA Division I Men's Ice Hockey Tournament

Deaths

Season articles

See also
1974 in sports

References